Kingyo (Japanese: goldfish) may refer to:
Kingyo Rock, rock which lies at the south side of Omega Glacier where the glacier meets the sea, on the coast of Queen Maud Land 
Kingyo, 2009 short film by Edmund Yeo loosely adapted from "Canaries" by Yasunari Kawabata
Kingyo (band), Japanese band consisting of former Dream member Yu Hasebe and soloists Aiko Kayō and Nao Nagasawa
Kingyo (song), song by Bonnie Pink
"Kingyo", song by Miki Furukawa
"Kingyo", song by Miyuki Nakajima

See also
Goldfish Warning! (きんぎょ注意報!, Kingyo Chūihō!) is a shōjo manga by Neko Nekobe
Bataashi Kingyo (バタアシ金魚)  Japanese manga series by Minetarō Mochizuki and live action film directed by Joji Matsuoka in 1990.
Kingyo Used Books (Japanese: 金魚屋古書店, Hepburn: Kingyoya Koshoten)  Japanese manga series
Kingyo Hanabi (金魚花火; Goldfish Fireworks)  Ai Otsuka's fifth single  2004
Goldfish scooping (金魚すくい, 金魚掬い, Kingyo-sukui) is a traditional Japanese game in which a player scoops goldfish with a special scooper